Saint-Hyacinthe is a city in southwestern Quebec east of Montreal on the Yamaska River. The population as of the 2021 Canadian census was 57,239. The city is located in Les Maskoutains Regional County Municipality of the Montérégie region, and is traversed by the Yamaska River.  Quebec Autoroute 20 runs perpendicular to the river. Saint-Hyacinthe is the seat of the judicial district of the same name.

History 
Jacques-Hyacinthe Simon dit Delorme, owner of the seigneurie, started its settlement in 1757. He gave his patron saint name (Saint Hyacinth the Confessor of Poland) to the seigneurie, which was made a city in 1850.

St. Hyacinth's Cathedral is the seat of the Roman Catholic Diocese of Saint-Hyacinthe. It was erected in 1852.

2001 merger
As part of the 2000–06 municipal reorganization in Quebec, on 27 December 2001, the city of Saint-Hyacinthe amalgamated with five neighbouring towns (listed here with their populations as of 2001):
 Saint-Hyacinthe (39,739)
 Sainte-Rosalie (4,170)
 Saint-Thomas-d'Aquin (4,000)
 Sainte-Rosalie Parish (1,476)
 Saint-Hyacinthe-le-Confesseur, Quebec (1,151)
 Notre-Dame-de-Saint-Hyacinthe, Quebec (858)

Demographics 

In 2021, 9.8% of Saint-Hyacinthe residents were visible minorities, 1.3% were Indigenous, and the remaining 88.9% were white/European. The largest visible minority groups were Black (4.4%), Latin American (3.1%) and Arab (1.4%).

71.8% of residents were Christian, down from 88.8% in 2011. 63.2% were Catholic, 5.6% were Christian n.o.s, 1.6% were Protestant, and 1.3% were other Christian denominations or Christian-related traditions. Non-religious or secular people were 25.0% of the population, up from 9.9% in 2011. The only named non-Christian religions with adherents in Saint-Hyacinthe were Islam (2.6%) and Buddhism (0.2%). Other religions and spiritual traditions accounted for just 0.3% of the population.

In 2021, French was the mother tongue of 90.9% of residents. Other common first languages were Spanish (3.1%),  Arabic (0.9%) and English (0.9%). 0.7% listed both French and a non-official language as mother tongues, while 0.6% listed both French and English.

Economy 

Agriculture and its related derivates are at the heart of Saint-Hyacinthe's economic infrastructure. The city has been nicknamed the "Agricultural technopolis of Canada", because it is home to several research institutions in the field such as the centre de recherche sur les aliments, the Institut de recherche et développement en agro-environnement, the Institut de technologie agroalimentaire and the head office of the Artificial Insemination Center of Quebec.

Saint-Hyacinthe hosts numerous agriculture related events such as fairs, exposition and congresses and acts a hub in the field. The Agricultural Hall of Fame of Quebec decided to move there from Quebec City to give itself more visibility in the community.

In addition, it is also home to Orgues Létourneau and Casavant Frères, builders of pipe organs, and Intact Financial, formerly known as ING Canada.

Transport 
 Local bus service operated by Transport Scolaire Sogesco
 Paratransit service by MRC Les Maskoutains
 Train bus service to Mont-Saint-Hilaire station, connecting by Exo on the Mont-Saint-Hilaire line to Central Station in Downtown Montreal
 Interurban bus service by Exo de la Vallée du Richelieu sector
 Via Rail has several trains that stop at the Saint-Hyacinthe station

Education 

The South Shore Protestant Regional School Board previously served the municipality.

In association with the Université de Montréal, Saint-Hyacinthe is home to the only veterinary medicine faculty of Quebec and the only such school in North America where teaching is provided in French.

Sports
From 1989 to 1996 the city had a team in the Quebec Major Junior Hockey League known as the Saint-Hyacinthe Laser. From 2001 to 2009 the city was represented in the Ligue Nord-Américaine de Hockey (known as the Quebec Semi-Pro Hockey League (QSPHL) until 2004) by the Saint-Hyacinthe Cousin (200105), Saint-Hyacinthe Cristal (200506), Saint-Hyacinthe Top Design (200608) and Saint-Hyacinthe Chiefs (200809). The city's main hockey arena is the historic Stade L.P. Gaucher, which was built in 1937.

Notable people 

The following individuals were born or grew up in the region of Saint-Hyacinthe:
 Paul Arcand, host and journalist
 François Avard, author and screenwriter known for the television series Les Bougon
 Télesphore-Damien Bouchard (1881–1962), Quebec politician 
 Robert Bédard, professional tennis player, President of Tennis Québec, Vice-President of Tennis Canada, teacher (Bishop's College School), teacher and headmaster (St. Andrew's College, Aurora)
 Michel-Esdras Bernier, Former Minister of Inland Revenue
 Colonel (Ret.) Jean Berthiaume, OBE, CD, infantry officer of the Régiment de St-Hyacinthe and of the Royal 22e Régiment - 1915-2003
 Martin Brodeur, National Hockey League (NHL) hockey player, goalie for the New Jersey Devils
 Geneviève Brouillette, actress
 Anthony Chabot (1813-1888), businessman and entrepreneur know for his development of water systems and hydraulic mines, especially in Northern California.
 Gérard Côté, marathon runner
 Sébastien Demers, boxer
 Henriette Dessaulles (1860–1946), journalist (aka Fadette) 
 Gérald Fauteux (1900–1980), former Chief Justice of the Supreme Court of Canada 
 Willie Lamothe (1920–1992), singer and actor 
 Sir François Langelier (1838–1915), politician 
 Ricardo Larrivée, cooking show host
 Pierre Lassonde, businessperson and philanthropist
 Yvan Loubier, politician
 Victor Morin, notary, politician, and writer
 David Savard, NHL player for the Montreal Canadiens
 Hyacinthe-Marie Simon, dit Delorme, (1777–1814) son of Jacques-Hyacinthe Simon dit Delorme, the original owner of the seigneurie
 Mario Pouliot, former head hockey coach for Saint-Hyacinthe Laser LHJMQ

Gallery

See also 

 Alexander "Buck" Choquette
 Jewish colonies in Canada
 List of towns in Quebec

References

External links

 

Cities and towns in Quebec
 
Incorporated places in Les Maskoutains Regional County Municipality